Puerto Rico Highway 101 (PR-101) is a rural road leaving the town of Boquerón, Cabo Rojo and Lajas, to the town of San Germán. Among their intersections are the PR-100, PR-301 (to El Combate), PR-103 PR-116 (to Guánica), PR-166 and PR-102.

Major intersections

Related route

Puerto Rico Highway 3101 (PR-3101) is a road parallel to PR-101 between the municipalities of Lajas and San Germán. It is known as Calle San Blas in downtown Lajas.

See also

 List of highways numbered 101

References

External links

 Carretera 101, Cabo Rojo, Puerto Rico

101